The Miss Perú 1981 pageant was held on June 27, 1981. That year, 18 candidates were competing for the national crown. The chosen winner represented Peru at the Miss Universe 1981. The rest of the finalists would enter in different pageants.

Placements

Special Awards

 Best Regional Costume - La Libertad - Marylin Vega
 Miss Photogenic - Lambayeque - Lucila Boggiano
 Miss Elegance - Tacna - Patricia Calderón
 Miss Body - Moquegua - Lorena Castro
 Best Hair - Piura - Carolina Seminario
 Miss Congeniality - Junín - Emma Ugarte
 Most Beautiful Face - Lambayeque - Lucila Boggiano

.

Delegates

Amazonas - Patricia Heller
Apurímac - Elena Serra
Cajamarca - María Soledad Mariátegui
Callao - Marilú Choza Balarezo
Cuzco - Claudia Farfan Kilian
Europe Perú - Carolina Kecskemeti
Huancavelica - Julia Flores Cosme
Junín - Emma Ugarte
La Libertad - Marylin Vega Esparza
Lambayeque - Lucila Boggiano
Loreto - Concepcion Pineda
Madre de Dios - Giuliana Martinetti
Moquegua - Lorena Castro
Piura - Carolina Seminario
Region Lima - Gladys Silva
San Martín - Karin Bartra
Tacna - Patricia Calderón Mickle
Ucayali - Patricia Hart

References 

Miss Peru
1981 in Peru
1981 beauty pageants